Pyroglutamyl-peptidase I (also known as Pyrrolidonyl peptidase, is an enzyme (a cysteine peptidase) found in bacteria, plants and animals.

It can be used to distinguish certain Streptococcal organisms.

Other names are 5-oxoprolyl-peptidase, pyrase, pyrrolidonyl arylamidase, pyroglutamate aminopeptidase, pyroglutamyl aminopeptidase, L-pyroglutamyl peptide hydrolase, pyrrolidone-carboxyl peptidase, pyrrolidone-carboxylate peptidase, pyrrolidonyl peptidase, L-pyrrolidonecarboxylate peptidase, pyroglutamidase, pyrrolidonecarboxylyl peptidase) is an enzyme. This enzyme catalyses the following chemical reaction

 Release of an N-terminal pyroglutamyl group from a polypeptide, the second amino acid generally not being Pro

Human gene
PGPEP1

See also
 Pyrrolidonyl-beta-naphthylamide
 P-Dimethylaminocinnamaldehyde
 Pyroglutamic acid
 2-Naphthylamine

References

External links 
 

EC 3.4.19